Martin Canning (born 3 December 1981) is a Scottish football player and coach and is assistant manager at Stoke City. Canning played as a central defender for Ross County, Peterhead, Gretna, Hibernian and Hamilton Academical.

Playing career
Canning became Gretna's record signing in January 2006 after joining from Ross County in a £60,000 deal. He made 46 appearances for Gretna, scoring once against Livingston, and helped them to promotion to the Scottish Premier League in the 2006–07 season. He was cup tied for their run to the 2006 Scottish Cup Final.

His contract with Gretna was terminated by mutual consent on 31 January 2008 due to the ensuing financial crisis at Gretna. Canning had to waive money he was due by Gretna to ensure that he was released from his contract and he was subsequently named in a creditors list published by Gretna's administrator in April 2008.

In February 2008, Canning signed a 16-month contract on 16 February 2008 with Hibernian after impressing in two reserve games while on trial. Canning made 12 league appearances for Hibs, but was released on 1 September 2008 to make way for new signing Souleymane Bamba. Canning then signed for Hamilton Academical on the same day.

Canning started coaching Hamilton's under-17 team, while continuing his playing career, in the 2012–13 season. He signed a new one-year contract with Hamilton in May 2013. A year later, he was part of the Accies team which won promotion to the Scottish Premiership, via a play-off win over his previous club Hibernian. Canning maintained his playing registration after being appointed Hamilton manager in 2015. Despite only making three first team appearances in the 2015–16 season due to injury, he extended his playing contract by another year in May 2016.

Coaching career
Canning became interim player-manager of Hamilton Academical in January 2015, after Alex Neil left to join Norwich City. He was appointed manager on a permanent basis later that month, despite having lost all three matches as caretaker manager.

Hamilton finished 11th in the 2016–17 Scottish Premiership, then avoided relegation by winning a play-off against Dundee United. Hamilton again avoided relegation in 2017/18 by finishing in 10th place. Canning left Hamilton in January 2019 by mutual consent.

Since departing Hamilton, Canning has been at Real Betis, Celtic, Leicester City, Preston, Aberdeen and Sunderland to assist with coaching.

In August 2019, Canning took on the role as Head of Coaching at North Kelvin United on an interim basis. In November 2019, he was appointed permanently.

Canning was appointed assistant manager of Stoke City in September 2022.

Career statistics

Managerial statistics

Honours
Scottish Premiership Manager of the Month: November 2017

References

External links

Hamilton Academical Manager - Martin Canning Details Fitbastats

1981 births
Living people
Footballers from Glasgow
Association football central defenders
Gretna F.C. players
Hamilton Academical F.C. players
Hibernian F.C. players
Peterhead F.C. players
Ross County F.C. players
Scottish Football League players
Scottish footballers
Scottish Premier League players
Clydebank F.C. (1965) players
Scottish Professional Football League players
Scottish football managers
Hamilton Academical F.C. managers
Scottish Professional Football League managers
Hamilton Academical F.C. non-playing staff
Sunderland A.F.C. non-playing staff
Stoke City F.C. non-playing staff